Coal Face is a 1935 British documentary film short directed by Alberto Cavalcanti. With a film score by Benjamin Britten and a poem written and narrated by W.H. Auden, the film gives a glimpse into the lives of a Yorkshire mining community and the dangerous working conditions the miners routinely faced. The film largely reuses older footage from Tour of a British Coal Mine (1928), which was shot in Barnsley, Yorkshire.

References

External links 
 
 

1935 films
1935 documentary films
Black-and-white documentary films
Films set in Wales
Films directed by Alberto Cavalcanti
Documentary films about mining
British black-and-white films
1930s short documentary films
British short documentary films
GPO Film Unit films
1930s English-language films
1930s British films